V. T. Balram (born 21 May 1978) is an Indian politician from Kerala and a member of the Indian National Congress and vice-president of Kerala Pradesh Congress Committee. He was a member of the Kerala Legislative Assembly representing Thrithala constituency for two consecutive terms. Later he was defeated by M. B. Rajesh of Communist Party of India (Marxist) by a vote margin of 3173.

Early life and education
Balram was born to K. Sreenarayanan and V. T. Saraswathy on 21 May 1978, in Othalur near Thrithala in Palakkad district, Kerala. He did his schooling from Jawahar Navodaya Vidyalaya, Palakkad and Jawahar Navodaya Vidyalaya, Jhalawar.

He was University Union Councillor, Sree Krishna College, Guruvayur (1997) and Government Engineering College, Thrissur (2002); Senate Member, University of Calicut (1999–2000 and 2006–2007); Editor, KSU State Kalasala (2007–2008); State Secretary, Indian Youth Congress (2009–2010); State General Secretary, Indian Youth Congress (2010–2013).

He was elected a second time to the Kerala Legislative Assembly in 2016 Kerala Legislative Assembly election from the once communist bastion, Thrithala, at a time when his front, the UDF, managed to win only 47 seats out of the total 140. In 2021 Kerala Legislative Assembly election, Balram lost the election to Former Lok Sabha Member of Palakkad M. B. Rajesh.

Cultural and political image
In 2016, he supported Amnesty International in the controversy against Akhil Bharatiya Vidyarthi Parishad. He has admitted his son to a government school and declared that he does not want to raise him in any religion or caste. He is noted for his strong opposition to Hindutva and economic reservation for forward castes implemented by the LDF Government of Kerala. A vegetarian for 19 years, he protested against the beef ban in India by eating beef with his friends and shared the video on social media.

He was mocked by the Communist Party of India (Marxist) sympathizers for taking a photograph with transgender activist Sheethal Shyam during a pride parade, for which then Lok Sabha Member M. B. Rajesh tendered an unconditional apology.

In January 2018, he faced an attack for his unsavory comments in social media on the late communist leader A. K. Gopalan, accusing him of child abuse for falling in love with a 14-year-old girl.

References 

1978 births
Living people
People from Palakkad district
Indian National Congress politicians from Kerala
Kerala MLAs 2011–2016
Kerala MLAs 2016–2021